Mimbres is a census-designated place  in Grant County, New Mexico, United States. Its population was 667 as of the 2010 census. Mimbres has a post office with ZIP code 88049. New Mexico State Road 35 passes through the community. The post office was established in 1886. It was named after the Mimbres River.

Demographics

References

Census-designated places in New Mexico
Census-designated places in Grant County, New Mexico